Alfonso Alonso Blasco, commonly known as Sito Alonso, (born December 4, 1975) is a Spanish basketball coach who is the head coach for UCAM Murcia of the Spanish Liga ACB.

Coaching career

Pro clubs
Alonso made his coaching debut in the Liga Endesa (Spanish League) in 2008, with Joventut Badalona, a team where he had previously worked as an  assistant coach. He was sacked by the club in March 2010, after his team's poor results in Spain's national domestic league and in European-wide competition.

In 2011, Alonso once again became a head coach in Liga ACB, thanks to his signing of a new contract with Lagun Aro GBC. He left GBC in 2014 and signed with Spain's club Bilbao Basket.

In July 2016, he parted with Bilbao Basket, and he signed a two-year deal with Baskonia. Despite reaching the EuroLeague playoffs, Alonso and Baskonia split up after being eliminated by Valencia Basket in the semifinals of the domestic league play-offs. Consequently, he signed a two-year contract with an optional third with FC Barcelona Lassa. On February 5, 2018, FC Barcelona part ways with him.

On June 8, 2018 Alonso signed three-year-contract with Cedevita Zagreb. On October 25, 2018, after a poor start of season, Cedevita sacked Alonso.

Spain national team
In the summer of 2013, Alonso was the head coach of the Spanish Under-20 junior national team, and he coached them to the bronze medal at the 2013 FIBA Europe Under-20 Championship, which was played in Tallinn, Estonia. He was also an assistant coach with the senior Spain men's national basketball team at the 2014 FIBA World Cup.

Alonso was also the head coach of the Aragon autonomous basketball team in 2006. He only managed the team in their 92–69 win against Japan.

Coaching record

EuroLeague

|- 
| align="left"|Joventut
| align="left"|2008–09
| 10 || 4 || 6 ||  || align="center"|Eliminated in group stage
|- 
| align="left"|Baskonia
| align="left"|2016–17
| 33 || 17 || 16 ||  || align="center"|Eliminated in quarterfinals
|- 
| align="left"|Barcelona
| align="left"|2017–18
| 21 || 7 || 14 ||  || align="center"|Fired
|-class="sortbottom"
| align="center" colspan=2|Career||64||28||36||||

Honours

Spain Under-20
FIBA Europe Under-20 Championship:
 2013

Individual
AEEB Spanish Coach of the Year: 2012

References

External links
 Sito Alonso at acb.com 
 Sito Alonso at euroleague.net
 Sito Alonso at fibaeurope.com

1975 births
Living people
Bilbao Basket coaches
Joventut Badalona coaches
KK Cedevita coaches
Liga ACB head coaches
Saski Baskonia coaches
Spanish basketball coaches